Ord Township, Nebraska may refer to the following places:

Ord Township, Antelope County, Nebraska
Ord Township, Valley County, Nebraska

Nebraska township disambiguation pages